Piprali is a village of Sikar district in Rajasthan. It is situated about 9.5 km in east from Sikar. Its population about 8,000.
Presently Piprali is a Panchayat samiti of Sikar.
Villages in Sikar district